Antoine Rufenacht (11 May 1939 – 5 September 2020) was a French right-wing (The Republicans) politician and former mayor of Le Havre.

He took the mayoral seat from Daniel Colliard (PCF) at the municipal election of 1995 and was reelected both in 2001, with a comfortable majority, and in 2008, against Daniel Paul (also PCF). He was also president of the local city community (called Communauté d'Agglomération Havraise - CODAH) which groups several municipalities around Le Havre,

Rufenacht was born in Le Havre. A former student of ÉNA, he was a junior minister (Secrétaire d'État) in the government of Raymond Barre, President of the regional council of Upper Normandy, and also a deputy.

Rufenacht's political career began in the then Gaullist party, the Union of Democrats for the Republic (UDR), and he remained in its successor parties, the Rally for the Republic (RPR), the UMP, and most recently, from 2015, the Republicans. In the presidential election of 1981, he backed the former Gaullist prime minister Michel Debré for the presidency against his own party leader, Jacques Chirac, but supported him in 1988 and 1995 and served successfully as his campaign manager for the presidential election of 2002.

With Jacques Barrot, he was seen as one of several possible successors of Dominique de Villepin as Prime Minister of France.

In October 2010, he resigned from his post as mayor of Le Havre to be replaced by Édouard Philippe.

Rufenacht died on 5 September 2020, aged 81.

References

1939 births
2020 deaths
Politicians from Le Havre
Mayors of places in Normandy
Politicians of the French Fifth Republic
École nationale d'administration alumni
Rally for the Republic politicians
Union for a Popular Movement politicians
The Republicans (France) politicians
Commandeurs of the Légion d'honneur
French Protestants